These page shows the results of the Men's Beach Volleyball Tournament at the 2000 Summer Olympics in Sydney, Australia, held from September 17 to September 26, 2000.

Medals

Results

Elimination rounds

Preliminary round
Winners advance to Round of 16 The 12 losers play elimination matches until 3 remain teams remain.
Competition Held on September 17, 2000

Preliminary Elimination
Competition Held on September 19, 2000,

First Round

Losers eliminated, and placed 19th

Second Round

Winners advance to Round of 16 plus team with highest point ratio; losers eliminated and place 17th

Kevin Wong & Robert Heidger Jr  Qualified due to highest point ratio.

Round of 16
Competition Held on September 22, 2000

Losers eliminated, place ninth

Quarter-finals
Competition Held on September 24, 2000

Losers eliminated, place fifth

Semi-finals
Competition Held on September 24, 2000

Bronze medal match
Competition Held on September 26, 2000

Gold Medal match
Competition Held on September 26, 2000

Final ranking

See also
 Women's Beach Volleyball Tournament
 Volleyball at the Summer Olympics

References
 Beach Volleyball Results

O
B
2000
Men's events at the 2000 Summer Olympics